Kolokolovo is a rural locality (a village) in Klenovskoye Selsoviet, Bolshesosnovsky District, Perm Krai, Russia. The population was 1 as of 2010. There is 1 street.

Geography 
Kolokolovo is located 26 km northwest of Bolshaya Sosnova (the district's administrative centre) by road. Klenovka is the nearest rural locality.

References 

Rural localities in Bolshesosnovsky District